Rebecca Lynn Howard is the debut studio album by American country music artist Rebecca Lynn Howard. Released in 2000, it charted on Billboard's Top Country Albums, peaking at No. 54 on May 9, 2000. It features the singles "When My Dreams Come True", "Out Here in the Water", and "I Don't Paint Myself Into Corners". "Corners" and "Melancholy Blue" were later covered by Trisha Yearwood on her 2001 album Inside Out; Yearwood's rendition of the latter was released as a single in 2001.

Track listing
"Heartsounds" (Marty Dodson, Rebecca Lynn Howard) – 3:19
"I Don't Paint Myself into Corners" (Trey Bruce, R. Howard) – 4:59
"Out Here in the Water" (Robin Lee Bruce, T. Bruce, R. Howard) – 3:26
"Melancholy Blue" (Tom Douglas, Harlan Howard) – 3:38
"You're Real" (Dodson, R. Howard) – 3:46
"Was It as Hard to Be Together" (R. Howard, Carl Jackson) – 3:46
"Move Me" (Dodson, R. Howard) – 2:46
"You're Not a Memory Yet" (R. Howard, Melba Montgomery, Jerry Salley) – 3:22
"Believe It or Not" (Dodson, Ron Harbin, R. Howard) – 3:47
"When My Dreams Come True" (T. Bruce, J.D. Martin) – 3:16
"Jesus, Daddy and You" (Dodson, R. Howard, Kim Williams) – 3:54
"Tennessee in My Windshield" (R. Howard, Williams) – 2:15

Personnel
Compiled from liner notes.

Musicians
 Robin Lee Bruce — background vocals
Mark Casstevens — acoustic guitar
Chad Cromwell — drums
Steve Cropper — electric guitar
 Eric Darken — percussion
Dan Dugmore — acoustic guitar
 Stuart Duncan — fiddle
 Shannon Forrest — drums
 Larry Franklin — fiddle
 Paul Franklin — steel guitar
 Wes Hightower — background vocals 
 Rebecca Lynn Howard — lead vocals 
 Jim Horn — saxophone
 Rebecca Lynn Howard — vocals
David Hungate — bass guitar
 Kirk "Jellyroll" Johnson — harmonica
 Marilyn Martin — background vocals
 Brent Mason — acoustic guitar, electric guitar
 Buddy Miller — background vocals
 Greg Morrow — drums
 Steve Nathan — piano, keyboards
 Michael Rhodes — bass guitar
 Brent Rowan — acoustic guitar, electric guitar
 Biff Watson — acoustic guitar

String section on "Melancholy Blue": Kristin Wilkinson, John Catchings, Donald Christian Teal, David Davidson

String section on "Believe It or Not": The Nashville String Machine

Technical
 David Campbell — string arrangements on "Believe It or Not", conductor
 Greg Droman — associate producer, engineering, mixing
 Kristin Wilkinson — string arrangements on "Melancholy Blue"
 Hank Williams — mastering
 Mark Wright — production

Chart performance

References 

2000 debut albums
Rebecca Lynn Howard albums
MCA Records albums
Albums produced by Mark Wright (record producer)